Abram Winegardner Harris (November 7, 1858 – February 21, 1935) was the fourteenth president of Northwestern University, serving from 1906 to 1916. He was also the first President of the University of Maine from 1896 to 1906.

Biography
Abram W. Harris was born in Philadelphia on November 7, 1858. A graduate of Wesleyan University (B.A. 1880, M.A. 1883), he came to Northwestern after a time as President of Maine State College ( 1893–1896), where he oversaw the transformation of the school into the University of Maine in 1896. At Northwestern, he helped develop the School of Commerce (now the Kellogg School of Management) in 1908. He retired from Northwestern after 10 years to take a position with the Methodist Episcopal Church in New York City.

Harris was also one of the founders and first president of the Honor Society Phi Kappa Phi and founder of Alpha Delta Tau.

He died in Philadelphia on February 21, 1935, while visiting his son, Abram W. Harris Jr.

References

Wesleyan University alumni
1858 births
1935 deaths
Presidents of Northwestern University
Presidents of the University of Maine
College fraternity founders